The 2021 Kerry Senior Football Championship was the 120th edition of Kerry GAA's premier Gaelic football tournament for senior teams in County Kerry, Ireland. The tournament consists of 16 teams (8 club teams and 8 divisional teams), with the winners representing Kerry in the Munster Senior Club Football Championship if they are a club team. If the winners are a divisional team the winners of the Kerry Club Football Championship represent the county.

The championship usually has a back-door format for the first two rounds before proceeding to a knock-out format. Generally, any team to lose two matches will be knocked out of the championship. This year however, due to the COVID-19 pandemic seen the competition employ a straight knockout format.

Format Structure Change
8 club teams and 8 divisional teams (16 in total) will take part in this year's S.F.C.

Kenmare District did not field a team for this year's S.F.C.

Relegation (See below): The club team to be relegated from the Senior County Championship will be the same team to be relegated from the Senior Club Championship (The 8 senior clubs play off against each other in two pools in the Club Championship. The two teams that finished bottom of the Group Pools enter a Relegation Final. This loser will be relegated to the I.F.C. for 2021. Should a club reach the final of the County championship they will be exempt from the Relegation process in the Club championship).

The winner of the 2021 I.F.C. will be promoted to the 2022 Senior County and Club Championships.

Team Changes
The following teams have changed division since the 2020 championship season.

To S.F.C.
Promoted from 2020 I.F.C.
 Spa  -  (Intermediate Champions)

From S.F.C.
Relegated to 2020 I.F.C.
 Kenmare District - (defunct)
 Kilcummin

Participating Teams
The teams taking part in the 2021 Kerry Senior Football Championship are:

Results

Round 1

All 16 teams enter the competition in Round 1. The eight winners proceed to the Quarter-Finals while the eight losers are eliminated.

Quarter-finals

Semi-finals

Final

Relegation play-off

The club team to be relegated from the Senior County Championship will be the same team to be relegated from the Senior Club Championship. The 8 senior clubs are placed into two groups containing four teams during the Club Championship. The teams to finish bottom of both groups will face off in the Relegation Final, with the loser being relegated to the I.F.C. for 2020. Should a club reach the final of the County championship they will be exempt from the Relegation process in the Club championship.

Championship statistics

Top scorers

Miscellaneous

 Austin Stacks win the title for the first time since 2014.
 Austin Stacks go back level with Dr Crokes at the top of the Roll of Honor with a 13th title. 
 Kerins O'Rahillys qualify for the final for the first time since 2008.
 Killarney Legion are relegated having been a senior club since 2006.

References

External links

Kerry Senior Football Championship
Kerry Senior Football Championship
Kerry SFC